AAA Northern New England (AAANE) is the affiliate of the American Automobile Association which serves the U.S. states of Vermont, New Hampshire, and Maine. It is based in Portland, Maine.

History
AAA Vermont was the Vermont arm of the American Automobile Association and was founded in 1903.

AAA New Hampshire was acquired by AAA Northern New England in 1997.

In 1999 and 2000, AAANE made donations to Vermont Technical College for a scholarship program for automotive technology students. It has also awarded scholarships to automotive technology students at Southern Maine Technical College.

In 2002, it announced an affiliation agreement with the Automobile Club of Southern California.

References

External links
AAA Northern New England

Northern New England
Transportation in Maine
Transportation in Vermont
Transportation in New Hampshire
Companies based in Portland, Maine